Tegan Bennett Daylight (born 1969, in Sydney) is an Australian writer of novels and short stories. She is best known as a fiction writer, teacher and critic, publishing both books of non-fiction and numerous short stories. She has also written several books for children and teenagers. She is the author of Bombora (1996), What Falls Away (2001) and Safety (2006).

Bombora was short-listed for the Australian/Vogel Literary Award and the Kathleen Mitchell Award. In 2002, she was named one of The Sydney Morning Herald’s “Best Young Australian Novelists”.

Bennett Daylight's story collection Six Bedrooms, was published by Vintage in 2015 and was shortlisted for the 2016 Stella Prize.

Daylight also works as a Creative Writing lecturer at Western Sydney University.

Having moved from Sydney, she now lives in Katoomba in the Blue Mountains with her husband Russell Daylight and their two children Alice and Patrick.

Publications

Novels
 Bombora (1996) published by Allen & Unwin
 What Falls Away (2001) published by Allen & Unwin
 Safety (2006) published by Vintage

Short stories
 Six Bedrooms (2015) published by Vintage Australia, an imprint of Penguin

Essays
 The Details (2020) published by Simon & Schuster Australia

Awards and honours
 The Stella Interview - The Stella Price (2016) 
 The Stella Prize Shortlist (2016)
 The Saturday Paper's Books of the Year (2015)

References

External links
 www.teganbennettdaylight.com  - Author website
 Safety - Tegan Bennett Daylight - at Random House
 Sydney Morning Herald'''s review of Safety''
''Bulletin Book Reviews''' review of Safety

1969 births
Living people
Australian women novelists
20th-century Australian novelists
21st-century Australian novelists